Komodou is a town and sub-prefecture in Kérouané Prefecture in the Kankan Region of Guinea. As of 2014 it had a population of 21,775 people.

References

Sub-prefectures of the Kankan Region